The Spotts Round Barn is a historic building located near Charles City in rural Floyd County, Iowa, United States. It was built in 1914 as a dairy and horse barn. Its design was influenced by the Iowa Agricultural Experiment Station. The building is a true round barn that measures  in diameter. It is constructed of clay tile from the Johnston Brothers Clay Works. It features a two-pitch roof, a large hay dormer on the north side and a  central silo. The barn has been listed on the National Register of Historic Places since 1986.

References

Infrastructure completed in 1914
Buildings and structures in Floyd County, Iowa
Barns on the National Register of Historic Places in Iowa
Round barns in Iowa
National Register of Historic Places in Floyd County, Iowa